Aiouea lehmannii is a species of plant in the family Lauraceae. It is found in Brazil and Colombia.

References

lehmannii
Least concern plants
Taxonomy articles created by Polbot